St. Michael's Hospital and Nurses' Residence is a property in Grand Forks, North Dakota that was listed on the National Register of Historic Places in 1995. It was also known as St. Anne's Guest Home and denoted 32GF14, it was builtin 1907. It was designed  by architect George Hancock (1849- 1924). Grand Forks architect William J. Edwards  designed the Nurses' Residence in 1913.

It includes Classical Revival architecture. When listed the property included two contributing buildings. The listing is described in its NRHP nomination document.
The property is now known as "Riverside Manor". St. Anne's Guest Home relocated to North 17th Street in the 1981 because they were unable to comply with fire codes in the old building.

The building survived the 1997 Red River flood, but was nearly torn down to make way for new dikes. However, the U.S. Army Corps of Engineers was able to design a flood wall that would preserve the building.

In 2015 a $1.4 million renovation began, focusing on the bricks, roof, and windows. All 191 windows in the building were replaced.

References

Related reading
Clement Augustus Lounsberry  (1919) Early History of North Dakota: Essential Outlines of American History  (Liberty Press)

Hospital buildings completed in 1913
Neoclassical architecture in North Dakota
Hospital buildings on the National Register of Historic Places in North Dakota
Residential buildings on the National Register of Historic Places in North Dakota
1913 establishments in North Dakota
National Register of Historic Places in Grand Forks, North Dakota